"Tell Me When" is a song by British synthpop group the Human League, released as the first single from their seventh album, Octopus (1995). Written jointly by lead singer Philip Oakey and Paul C. Beckett, it was recorded at 'Human League Studios', Sheffield same year. The single and the album were produced by Ian Stanley (formerly of Tears for Fears). It peaked at number six on the UK Singles Chart, while reaching number four on the UK Dance Chart. In the US, it peaked at number 31 on the Billboard Hot 100, number 15 on the Billboard Hot Dance Club Play chart and number eight on the Cash Box Top 100.

Background
The song was originally written for the act, "Fast Arithmetic" (Oakey – Beckett), A side project in development within the HL environment. A demo version was recorded in 1991 and presented to Max, Ian and Jean at East West. It then became the first release by the band under their new label EastWest, who had signed the Human League after their dismissal by Virgin in 1992.

As it was the first commercial release in the UK by the band for four years it is often incorrectly described as a comeback as many people erroneously believed the band had disbanded in 1990. Band principal Philip Oakey took issue with this description and said in an interview that the band has never stopped recording and performing since its formation in 1977. The band had collaborated with Yellow Magic Orchestra prior to signing with EastWest.

Release and promotion
"Tell Me When" was the first Human League single to be released from Octopus and was issued in advance of the album. It was issued on 26 December 1994. Released in a variety of vinyl and CD single formats, these variously included remixes of "Tell Me When" by contemporary electronic acts Utah Saints, Development Corporation and Red Jerry, a non-album B-side ("The Bus to Crookes"), and a track from the band's recent collaboration with YMO.

"Tell Me When" became the Human League's most commercially successful single in nine years and reintroduced the band to many of the British general public. It received considerable radio promotion in advance of its late 1994 UK release, hitting the airwaves at a time when many people started to get Christmas song fatigue. Radio 1 played the song three weeks before release with Capital FM playing it two weeks prior. By the time of its release, the single received over one thousand plays per week across the board according to East West Records. One month after its release, the single steadily gained airplay on Europe's leading radio markets. It topped the Major Market Airplay charts in the UK for two weeks commencing 4 February, registering total plays of 915 for the week of 11 February. According to East West Records, the single had achieved sales of around 200,000 copies. Capital 95.8 head of music Richard Park welcomed the single, saying: "the marketplace is just ready for a fresh dose of the Human League." It peaked at number six on the UK Singles Chart in early 1995, their highest UK chart position since "(Keep Feeling) Fascination" reached number two in 1983, and spent a total of nine weeks on the chart. It also peaked at number 31 on the Billboard Hot 100, on 15 April 1995, giving the band their last hit to date in the United States. The song fared well on the Mainstream Top 40 chart, where it peaked at number nine on 22 April 1995. Additionally, it reached number eight on the Cash Box Top 100.

Critical reception
Several critics of the Octopus album, singled out "Tell Me When" as a standout track. Dave Thompson of AllMusic said it echoes earlier material, likening it to "Fascination" and "Mirror Man". He went further, saying that "the real difference is found in the vignette-esque lyrics and the more complex vocals. And these slight changes make all the difference, turning synth dreams into techno club success." David Bauder of Associated Press called the song "splendid", and noted that it is a "shimmering melody, with Kraftwerk-like synthesizers and Phil Oakey's arch voice sweetened by his two female colleagues. It ranks with their best work". He added that it was the only song from the album "with any worth." Also Larry Flick from Billboard was favourable, writing, "British synth-pop act that enjoyed a high profile during the '80s returns with a percolating swinger, which harkens back to its now-classic hits, 'Don't You Want Me' and 'Fascination'." Anderson Jones from Entertainment Weekly described it as "bubbly" and "radio-friendly", whilst calling the album "lackuster". In his weekly UK chart commentary, James Masterton said, "It may not be the biggest new hit of the week but it is certainly the most significant", concluding with that it is "sounding like typical Human League of old". 

A reviewer from Music & Media commented, "Comeback of the year? That's up to you. Anyway, the return of the Sheffield synth band in the premier division of pop creates an enormous buzz in radio land." In the album review, the reviewer said that "Tell Me When" "portrays Phil Oakey and the girls as a perfect replica of the electro pop band around 1981's Dare album." Music Week rated the single five out of five, describing it as "pristine synth pop as a deep Oakey lead and girl harmonies make this the most joyful single of the week. Welcome back." John Kilgo from The Network Forty wrote, "This is a great comeback for the Sheffield, England trio! A techno-pop release full of energy highlighted by a very catchy hook. This smash is a no-brainer." People Magazine stated that "their hot new single "Tell Me When" has made the Human League hip again." They added, "But the tune is an infectious anachronism—the synthesizer trio still tinkle about as soullessly as they did in 1982, when they hit No. 1 with "Don't You Want Me"." James Hamilton from the RM Dance Update deemed it "typical Human League holler". Tony Cross from Smash Hits felt it is "the best thing" on the album. David Sinclair of The Times commented, "All the familiar components are here join-the-dots tune, danceable synth-pop arrangement, catchy bubblegum chorus but the result sounds disconcertingly like the Human League by numbers."

Music video

A music video was produced to promote the single, and was shot entirely on location in Prague in the Czech Republic. It is directed by British director Andy Morahan. In the video, several well-known sites in the city can be seen, as Wenceslas Square, Prague Castle and Wallenstein Garden.

Track listing
 CD 1 1994, East West (YZ882CD1)
 "Tell Me When" (7-inch edit) 4.42
 Tell Me When" (Mix 1) 5.09 (Remix by Utah Saints)
 "Kimi Ni Mune Kyun (YMO Vs The Human League)" 4.55
 "The Bus to Crookes" 4.52

 CD 2 1994, East West (YZ882CD2)
 "Tell Me When" (Mix 2) 6.11 (Remix by Utah Saints)
 "Tell Me When" (Red Jerry Remix) 7.36
 "Tell Me When" (Strictly Blind Dub) 5.51 (Remix by Development Corporation)
 "Tell Me When" (Overworld Mix) 6.26 (Remix by Development Corporation)
 "Tell Me When" (Mix 1) 5.09 (Remix by Utah Saints)

 US CD 1994, East West Records America (66147-2)
 "Tell Me When" (Utah Saints Mix 2*) 6.12
 "Tell Me When" (Red Jerry Mix) 7.36
 "Tell Me When" (Strictly Blind Dub) 5.51 (Remix by Development Corporation)
 "Tell Me When" (Edit Version Overworld Mix) 5.25 (Remix by Development Corporation)
 "Tell Me When" (Utah Saints Mix 1*) 5.09

These versions (*) are identical to the UK mixes.

Charts

Weekly charts

Year-end charts

References

1994 singles
1994 songs
East West Records singles
The Human League songs
Music videos directed by Andy Morahan
Song recordings produced by Ian Stanley
Songs written by Philip Oakey